The 1962 Washington Senators season involved the Senators finishing 10th in the American League with a record of 60 wins and 101 losses, 35½ games behind the World Champion New York Yankees. 1962 was the first season in which the Senators played their home games at D.C. Stadium.

Offseason 
 October 5, 1961: Dick Donovan, Gene Green, and Jim Mahoney were traded by the Senators to the Cleveland Indians for Jimmy Piersall.
 November 21, 1961: Coot Veal was purchased from the Senators by the Pittsburgh Pirates.
 December 15, 1961: Marty Keough and Johnny Klippstein were traded by the Senators to the Cincinnati Reds for Dave Stenhouse and Bob Schmidt.

Regular season

Season standings

Record vs. opponents

Roster

Player stats

Batting

Starters by position 
Note: Pos = Position; G = Games played; AB = At bats; H = Hits; Avg. = Batting average; HR = Home runs; RBI = Runs batted in

Other batters 
Note: G = Games played; AB = At bats; H = Hits; Avg. = Batting average; HR = Home runs; RBI = Runs batted in

Pitching

Starting pitchers 
Note: G = Games pitched; IP = Innings pitched; W = Wins; L = Losses; ERA = Earned run average; SO = Strikeouts

Other pitchers 
Note: G = Games pitched; IP = Innings pitched; W = Wins; L = Losses; ERA = Earned run average; SO = Strikeouts

Relief pitchers 
Note: G = Games pitched; W = Wins; L = Losses; SV = Saves; ERA = Earned run average; SO = Strikeouts

Farm system 

Syracuse affiliation shared with New York Mets

References

External links
1962 Washington Senators team page at Baseball Reference
1962 Washington Senators team page at www.baseball-almanac.com

Texas Rangers seasons
Washington Senators season
Washing